The Return of El Santo is the second album by the Latin ska band King Changó, released in 2000. The album's title is a tribute to Mexican wrestler El Santo.

Production
The album was recorded in various cities with producers KC Porter, Macaco, and Richard Blair.

Critical reception
The Washington Post wrote that "it's a breathtakingly ambitious recording, and it works because the band doesn't jump from style to style but fuses them into a fresh, coherent sound." CMJ New Music Monthly called the album "ravenous, rowdy pop giddily blurring the lines between genres." Billboard deemed it "100% Nuyorican worldbeat." The Chicago Tribune wrote that "the song cycle ends in a happy revolution, way over the top, romantic and cynical all at once." The Arizona Republic wrote: "Each cut is an addictive, sarcastic fiesta in itself. Mucho percussion. Mucho horns. Mucho cajones."

Track listing
 "Finalmente" (Andrew Blanco, Luis Blanco, Glenda Lee) – 4:33
 "El Santo" (A. Blanco, L. Blanco, Luis Ruíz, Mike Wagner) – 4:01
 "Brujería" (A. Blanco, L. Blanco) – 5:11
 "Tú Verás" (Ramón Nova) – 6:28
 "What Politicians Say" (Francisco Gallardo, Lee, Nova, M. Viera, A. Vlanco) – 3:15
 "I Don't Care" (A. Blanco, L. Blanco) – 4:03
 "Sin Ti" (A. Blanco, L. Blanco) – 4:47
 "Best Dressed Pimp" (A. Blanco, Lee, Ruíz) – 4:01
 "Lil' Sister" (A. Blanco, L. Blanco, Lee, Candice Owens) – 5:13
 "Full Time Business" (A. Blanco, J.B. Eck, Gallardo, Lee) – 2:51
 "Step Me Down" (A. Blanco, Gallardo, Lee, Nova, Viera) – 4:20
 "Champion Sound" (A. Blanco, Nova) – 6:17

References

2000 albums
Luaka Bop albums
Cultural depictions of El Santo